Clounagh Junior High School is a controlled school on the Brownstown Road, Portadown, Northern Ireland. It accepts male and female pupils following primary education. Generally, children attend for three years (from ages 11–14) however, those with special educational needs stay for an extra two years. After the children leave, they are ordinarily transferred to either Portadown College or Craigavon Senior High School.

It follows Craigavon two-tier system, commonly called the Dickson Plan. As of 2022, the school principal is Raymond Hill, formerly senior vice-principal. In 2016, he succeeded Trevor Canning following the retirement of the latter.

School facilities
Clounagh Junior High School offers a number of subjects which are served by 41 classrooms, including 4 science laboratories, 3 I.C.T. rooms, 2 Home Economics rooms, as well as Technology & Design, Art, and Music Suites. In 2014 the school's Art department was refurbished. The art suite now consists of 2 new classrooms, a digital studio, and a new kiln room with ceramics area.

The school site of 18 acres includes 2 all-weather hockey pitches, 2 grass rugby/football pitches, 2 outdoor netball courts, a 300m athletics grass track, 2 long jump pits, 2 high jump areas, and 2 shot put areas. The school has two gymnasia; the larger one is used as an assembly hall, while the smaller one is primarily used as an indoor basketball court.

References

External links
 Clounagh Junior High School official website

Secondary schools in County Armagh